The 1875 Wesleyan Methodists football team represented Wesleyan University during the 1875 college football season. The team lost its only game to Yale. They lost 6–0 in a 20-per-side game.

References

Wesleyan
Wesleyan Cardinals football seasons
College football winless seasons
Wesleyan Methodists football